Josh Saviano (born March 31, 1976) is an American lawyer and former child actor who played Kevin Arnold's best friend, Paul Pfeiffer, in the ABC television show The Wonder Years.

Early life
Saviano was born in White Plains, New York and raised in North Caldwell, New Jersey. His mother is Jewish and his father is Italian-American.

Acting 
His role in The Wonder Years was one of his few television or movie roles. His first television appearance was a one-line role in a commercial for Aim toothpaste. Saviano's other roles were as Kid Belz in the movie The Wrong Guys in 1988 and Max Plotkin in the made-for-TV movie Camp Cucamonga in 1990. He appeared in an uncredited cameo in the 1989 movie The Wizard starring Fred Savage. He guest starred on the show The Ray Bradbury Theater in 1989 as Willie and on Reading Rainbow and Fun House as himself. Saviano once starred in a television commercial for the Oldsmobile Silhouette.

Saviano stopped acting, went to college and became a lawyer, but from 2014 to 2015, Saviano returned to television to play a lawyer in three episodes of Law & Order: Special Victims Unit.

Later career
Saviano majored in political science at Yale University where he became president of Sigma Nu fraternity. Upon graduation in 1998, he worked for a while as a paralegal for a New York City law firm. In 2000, he worked for an Internet firm before earning a J.D. degree from the Benjamin N. Cardozo School of Law at Yeshiva University. He was admitted to the bar in New York. He joined the law firm Morrison Cohen LLP becoming a Senior Counsel in 2011 and Partner in 2013. He left Morrison Cohen in 2015 to found two start-up endeavors: law firm JDS Legal and celebrity brand consultancy Act 3 Advisors.

Filmography

Films

Television

References

External links

Photos and a small article on Josh Saviano

1976 births
Living people
20th-century American male actors
American lawyers
American male child actors
American male television actors
American people of Italian descent
Benjamin N. Cardozo School of Law alumni
Male actors from New York (state)
People from White Plains, New York
Yale University alumni
Jewish American male actors
Jewish American attorneys